Charles Ledger (4 March 1818 – 19 May 1905) was an alpaca farmer noted for his work in connection with quinine, a treatment for malaria.

Background
Ledger belonged to a huguenot family that emigrated to England in the 18th century; he was born at 1 Bucklersbury, City of London, the son of George Ledger, a mercantile broker, and his wife Charlotte, née Warren. After leaving school he went to Peru and in 1836 was a clerk in a British merchant's office at Lima. It was at Lima that Charles rescued a drowning native Manuel Incra Mamani, who offered to become his servant.

Alpaca career
He became an expert in alpaca wool, and in 1842 began business as a dealer in South American products. In 1847 he was grazing sheep and cattle half-way between Tacna and La Paz, and in 1852 went to Sydney to inquire into the possibility of introducing the alpaca into Australia. He returned to South America and by 1859 had brought several hundred alpacas to Sydney. This was a hazardous and difficult business as the export of alpacas was forbidden. Ledger was paid £15,000 for his alpacas and given a position in charge of them. The attempt to acclimatize alpacas in Australia ended in failure, but Ledger was not at fault.

Quinine production
Ledger returned to South America in 1864 and turned his attention to another problem. The cinchona tree, the bark of which yields quinine, grew in Ecuador, Peru, and Bolivia, but the export of either trees or seeds was prohibited. The trees were being wastefully cut down without being replaced, and there was some danger that they might become extinct. Some seeds and plants had been introduced into Europe and Asia by Hugh Algernon Weddell in 1848, and Sir Clements Markham went later to Peru, and Bolivia, and succeeded in acclimatizing trees in Asia and the Dutch East Indies.

Ledger, however, employed Manuel Incra Mamani to find a better variety for producing quinine. In 1865, after four years of frost destroying high-quinine plant seeds (plants with a lower proportion were hardier), Mamani was able to collect some seeds from a high-quinine specimen. Ledger sent them to his brother George Ledger in London. The seed was sent to London where some of it was purchased by the Dutch government. Seeds were also sent to India and Queensland but the trees do not appear to have been grown in Australia. 

The high-quinine plant was named Cinchona ledgeriana.

In 1871, Mamani was arrested whilst on a seed hunting trip, and beaten so severely that he died soon afterwards. Ledger ceased to collect seeds and provided money to Mamani's family.

In 1883 Ledger went to Sydney again and in 1884 took a farm 20 miles (30 km) from Goulburn, New South Wales.

Retirement and death
Losing his savings in the bank failures of the early 1890s, efforts were made by Sir Clements Markham and others to obtain some provision for Ledger from the Indian and Dutch governments. Initially this was refused, but in 1897 on Ledger's 79th birthday, he received news that the Dutch government had granted him an annuity of £100 a year. He died eight years later in 1905 at 'Mimosa Cottage', Elswick St, Leichhardt, Sydney. He is buried in Rookwood Cemetery, Sydney.

Impact
Ledger did a great service to the world, as millions of cinchona trees grown in India and Java sprang originally from the seeds he collected. By 1900 two-thirds of the world's supply of quinine came from Java, and over 40 years later the Ledger types of cinchona were still the best quinine yielders.

References

Part of Ledger's own account of his life can be found at p. 118, Chemist and Druggist, 27 July 1895, which is available as a searchable archive.
Some of Ledger's papers are available at the State Library of NSW: ML MSS.630

Further reading
R. S. Desowitz 1991. The Malaria Capers. Norton and Co., New York, NY.
M. Honigsbaum, The Fever Trail: In Search of the Cure for Malaria (London, 2001)
G. Ledger, The Alpaca: Its Introduction into Australia, and the Probabilities of its Acclimatisation There (Melbourne, 1861)
N. Taylor, Cinchona in Java: The Story of Quinine (New York, 1945)
G. Gramiccia, The Life of Charles Ledger (181-1905): Alpacas and Quinine Macmillan, 1988.

1818 births
1905 deaths
Quinine
Clerks